is a passenger railway station located in the city of Asaka, Saitama, Japan, operated by the private railway operator Tōbu Railway.

Lines
Located between Asaka and Shiki stations, it is 16.4 km from the Tōbu Tōjō Line terminus at Ikebukuro. Rapid Express, Express, Semi express, and Local services stop at this station.

The station is adjacent and at right angles to Kita-Asaka Station on the Musashino Line operated by JR East.

Station layout
The station consists of two island platforms serving four tracks. The station building is located above the platforms, which are situated in a cutting.

Platforms

History
The station opened on 6 August 1974.

Through-running to and from  via the Tokyo Metro Fukutoshin Line commenced on 14 June 2008.

From 17 March 2012, station numbering was introduced on the Tōbu Tōjō Line, with Asakadai Station becoming "TJ-13".

From March 2023, Asakadai Station became a Rapid Express service stop following the abolishment of the Rapid (快速, Kaisoku) services and reorganization of the Tōbu Tōjō Line services.

Passenger statistics
In fiscal 2019, the station was used by an average of 161,762 passengers daily.

Passenger figures for previous years (boarding passengers only) are as shown below.

Surrounding area

 Kita-Asaka Station (JR Musashino Line)
 Toyo University Asaka Campus

Bus services
From 17 July 2008, there is a direct express bus service to/from Narita Airport. The bus stop is on the south side of the station.

See also
 List of railway stations in Japan

References

External links

 Tobu station information  

Tobu Tojo Main Line
Stations of Tobu Railway
Railway stations in Saitama Prefecture
Railway stations in Japan opened in 1974
Asaka, Saitama